This is a list of Members elected to the last Legislative Council in the colonial period at the 1995 election, held on 17 September 1995.

Composition

Note: Italic represents organizations that still function but become under another affiliation.

Graphical representation of the Legislative Council

List of Members elected in the legislative election
The following table is a list of LegCo members elected on 17 September 1995.

Key to changes since legislative election:
a = change in party allegiance
b = by-election

Other changes
 Independent legislator Emily Lau (New Territories East), Lau Chin-shek (Kowloon West) of the Democratic Party,  Lee Cheuk-yan (Manufacturing) of the Hong Kong Confederation of Trade Unions, Leung Yiu-chung (Textiles and Garments) of the Neighbourhood and Worker's Service Centre, and Independent Elizabeth Wong (Community, Social and Personal Services) co-founded The Frontier on 26 August 1996.
 Choy Kan-pui (Election Committee), a Civil Force member joined the Hong Kong Progressive Alliance around 1995 to 1996.
 Christine Loh (Hong Kong Island Central) formed the Citizens Party in May 1997.

See also
 1995 Hong Kong legislative election

References
 Report on the 1995 Legislative General Election, Boundary and Election Commission

Legislative Council of Hong Kong